União Desportiva da Serra is a Portuguese football club that competes in the fourth-tier Campeonato de Portugal.  They were founded in 1976.

History
The club was founded in 1976. On 18 August 2010, they played a friendly match against India and was beaten by 3–1.

Appearances

II Divisão: 3 (highest ranking: 7th)
III Divisão: 2 (highest ranking: 2nd)
AF Leiria: highest ranking: 1

Honours
AF Leiria – 1a Divisão:

Brand and sponsor
Legea (manufacturer brand), Lena Construções (sponsor)

External links
Official website 

Football clubs in Portugal
Association football clubs established in 1976
Sport in Leiria
1976 establishments in Portugal